Nampé is a commune in the Cercle of Koutiala in the Sikasso Region of southern Mali. The commune covers an area of 142 square kilometers and includes 4 villages. In the 2009 census it had a population of 7,009. The village of Baramba, the administrative centre (chef-lieu) of the commune, is 25 km north of Koutiala.

References

External links
.

Communes of Sikasso Region